Němčovice is a municipality and village in Rokycany District in the Plzeň Region of the Czech Republic. It has about 200 inhabitants.

Administrative parts
The village of Olešná is an administrative part of Němčovice.

References

Villages in Rokycany District